New Year Pass is a low snow pass between the Moore Mountains and Mount Weeks in Queen Elizabeth Range. This pass was used on New Year's Day, 1958, by a New Zealand party of the Commonwealth Trans-Antarctic Expedition (1956–58) to get from Marsh Glacier to January Col, Prince Andrew Plateau, overlooking Bowden Neve.

Mountain passes of the Ross Dependency
Shackleton Coast